The Nagercoil–Tirunelveli line connects the cities of Tirunelveli and Nagercoil in the state of Tamilnadu in Southern Railway zone. Thiruvananthapuram–Nagercoil–Kanyakumari line and Tirunelveli–Nagercoil construction projects were inaugurated by Prime Minister Indira Gandhi on 6 September 1972. The maximum speed of trains running between Tirunelveli to Nagercoil is 100 km per hour.

History and timeline

1955-56:-  Survey for this line was sanctioned.	
1964-65:- The survey completed.	
6 September 1972:- The inauguration of the construction project by the then Prime minister Mrs.Indira Gandhi.	
1981:- The line  have been opened to traffic.

Stations 
There are 9 railway stations along the stretch. The details of the railway stations with annual earnings in 2016-2017 is shown below.

**Note:-

 Stations with blue background  - Stations generating Rs. 2,00,00,000(Rs. 2 Crore) or more in a financial year.
 The criteria for categorization of stations have now been revised to include footfalls at the station. The stations have been clubbed into three groups -- Non-suburban (NS), Suburban (S) and Halt (H). These groups have further been put in grades ranging from NSG 1-6, SG 1-3 and HG 1-3, respectively.

Electrification & track doubling 
The section is fully electrified. Track doubling work is in progress and expected to finished in 2022.

Rail Traffic
Around 25 trains running through this line including super-fast, express and passenger services. More trains are expected to be introduced along the route with the completion of track doubling.

References

External links

Thiruvananthapuram railway division
Railway stations opened in 1979
Transport in Nagercoil
5 ft 6 in gauge railways in India
Transport in Tirunelveli